Davy Jones is the second solo studio album by English recording artist and actor Davy Jones. It includes the single, "Rainy Jane", which reached No. 52 on the Billboard Hot 100.

Charts
Davy Jones reached number 205 on Billboard Top Albums chart.

Track listing

Original 1971 vinyl issue

2012 CD bonus tracks

Personnel
Credits adapted from CD liner notes.
Davy Jones – vocals

Additional
 Al Capps – arranger, conductor
 Beverly Weinstein – art direction
 Jim O'Connell – album design
 Lenny Roberts – sound engineer
 Norbert Jobst – photography
 Jackie Mills – producer
 Joe Reagoso – producer, remastering, liner notes (2012 CD release)

References

External links 
 Davy Jones - The Bell Recordings (1971-72)
 www.davyjones.net

1971 albums
Davy Jones (musician) albums